Novamedia was started in 1983 by Boudewijn Poelmann and his wife Annemiek Hoogenboom. In 1989, Poelmann joined forces with Simon Jelsma, Frank Leeman en Herman de Jong to establish the Dutch National Postcode Lottery. In 2002, Novamedia took over the operations of the Bankgiroloterij.

In 2009 the Charity Lotteries operated by Novamedia produced a turnover of more than 728 million euros, of which more than 364 million euros was divided among the charities. Since its inception, Novamedia has collected over 4 billion euros for more than 240 charities for people, nature, culture and health & welfare.

References 

Lotteries